Gladiator: Street Fighter is the second book in the Gladiator Series, by Simon Scarrow.

Plot summary 
Marcus Cornelius Primus now works for Caesar.

Style
The Gladiator series is intended for young teens and older. The story is quite clear, fast and without excessive details. The frequent action scenes are described very precisely and graphically.

External links

References

2012 British novels
Gladiator (novel series)
Novels set in the 1st century BC
Penguin Press books